Richard B. Smith may refer to:
Richard Bowyer Smith (1837–1919),Australian inventor
Richard B. Smith (New York politician) (1878–1937), American politician
Richard Bernhard Smith (1901–1935), American composer
Richard Baird Smith (1818–1861), British military engineer